This is a list of English words of Sanskrit origin. Most of these words were not directly borrowed from Sanskrit. The meaning of some words have changed slightly after being borrowed.

Both languages belong to the Indo-European language family and have numerous cognate terms. Innumerous words like "Mortal", "Feet", "End", "Path", "Mother", "Father" and the names of the numbers 1-10 are cognates of English and Sanskrit, along with other Indo-European languages like German, Latin, French or Persian. However, this list is strictly of the words which is taken from Sanskrit:

A
 Ambarella  through   ultimately from Sanskrit: अम्बरेल्ला, a kind of tree.
 Aniline  through , French: Aniline and Portuguese: Anil from Arabic النيل al-nili and Persian نیلا nila, ultimately from Sanskrit नीली nili.
 Aryan  from Sanskrit  , “noble; noble one” though it originally stems from the Proto-Indo-Iranian autonym . First attested in English in 1839, it was likely coined as a loan from earlier scholars in Europe writing in German and French who in turn borrowed directly from Sanskrit. 
 Atoll  through Dhivehi :  possibly from Sanskrit  , interior, though there are other theories. 
 Aubergine  from French , in Catalan , via Arabic   and Persian  bâdenjân ultimately from Sanskrit  , meaning eggplant or aubergine.
 Avatar  from Sanskrit  , which means "descent", an avatar refers to the human incarnation of God during times of distress on earth. Thus, Krishna and Rāma were both avatars of Vishnu, who also manifested himself as an avatar many other times, ten of which are considered the most significant.

B
 Bandana  from Sanskrit बन्धन bandhana, "a bond".
 Banyan  from Hindi baniyaa ultimately from Sanskrit वणिज्‌ vaṇij, which means "a merchant".
 Basmati  through Hindi बासमती ultimately from Sanskrit वास vāsa.
 Bahuvrihi  from Sanskrit बहुव्रीहि bahuvrīhih, a composite word, meaning 'much rice'.
 Bidi  through Hindi बीड़ी ultimately from Sanskrit वितिक vitika.
 Bhakti  from Sanskrit भक्ति "bhakti", portion or more importantly, devotion. 
 Brinjal  from Portuguese bringella or beringela, from Persian بادنجان badingān, probably from Sanskrit vātiṅgaṇa.
 Buddha  from Sanskrit बुद्ध buddha, which means "awakened, enlightened", refers to Siddhartha Gautama, founder of Buddhism. Also refers to one who is enlightened in accordance with the teachings of Buddha or a likeness of Buddha.

C
 Candy Middle English candi, crystallized cane sugar, short for sugre-candi, partial translation of Old French sucre candi, ultimately from Arabic sukkar qandī : sukkar, sugar + qandī, consisting of sugar lumps (from qand, lump of crystallized sugar, from an Indic source akin to Pali kaṇḍa-, from Sanskrit खाण्डक khaṇḍakaḥ, from khaṇḍaḥ, piece, fragment, perhaps of Munda origin).
 Carmine  Ultimately from Sanskrit कृमि kṛmi meaning "worm". See also Crimson.
 Cashmere 1680s, "shawl made of cashmere wool", from the old spelling of Kashmir, Himalayan kingdom where wool was obtained from long-haired goats.
 Chakram  from Sanskrit चक्रं Cakram, a circular throwing weapon
 Cheetah  which is from Sanskrit चित्रस chitra-s "uniquely marked".
 Chintz  from Hindi chint, from Sanskrit chitra-s "clear, bright".
 Chukar  via Hindi चकोर cakor and Urdu چکور chukar ultimately from Sanskrit चकोर cakorah.
 Chukker  from Hindi चक्कर and Urdu چکرchakkar, from Sanskrit चक्र cakra, "a circle, a wheel".
 Citipati  from Sanskrit चिति पति citi-pati, which means "a funeral pyre lord".
 Cot  from Hindi खाट khaat "a couch", which is from Sanskrit खट्वा khatva.
 Copra  from Portuguese copra (16c.), from koppara (cognate with Hindi khopra) "coconut"; related to Hindi khopri "skull", from Sanskrit kharparah "skull".
 Cowrie  from Hindi कौड़ी kauri and Urdu کمتدب kauri, from Marathi कवडी kavadi, which is ultimately from Sanskrit कपर्द kaparda.
 Crimson  from Old Spanish cremesin, via Medieval Latin cremesinus from Persian قرمز qirmiz "a kermes", which is ultimately from Sanskrit कृमिज krmi-ja literally: "red dye produced by a worm".
 Crocus  from Greek κρόκος crocus, via Semitic languages (e.g. Hebrew כרכום karkōm, Aramaic ܟܘܪܟܡܐ kurkama, Persian كركم kurkum, which mean saffron or saffron yellow); ultimately from Sanskrit कुङ्कुमं kunkumam.

D
 Dal  through Hindi दाल dāl ultimately from Sanskrit दल dala, meaning cotyledon of a pea pod, a type of Indian food; also refers to lentils.
 Das  from Sanskrit दास daasa, a slave or servant. See also Dasa.
 Datura  through Latin and Hindi: धतूरा dhatūra "jimson weed" ultimately from Sanskrit धत्तूरा dhattūrā, a kind of flowering plant.
 Deodar  through Hindi देओदार deodār ultimately from Sanskrit देवदारु devadāru, a kind of tree.
 Deva  from Sanskrit देव deva, which means "a god", akin to Latin deus, "god".
 Devi  from Sanskrit देवी devi, which means "a goddess".
 Dharma  from Sanskrit: धर्म dharma; akin to Latin: firmus, meaning "conformity to one's duty and nature" and "divine law".
 Dhoti  via Hindi dhotī (Hindi: धोती) ultimately from Sanskrit dhautī (Sanskrit: धौती) which means 'to wash', a traditional male garment used in India. Material tied around the waist that covers most of the legs.
 Dinghy  from Hindi दिन्गी dingi "a tiny boat", probably from Sanskrit द्रोण drona.
 Dvandva  is a Sanskrit technical term literally meaning "a pair".

G
 Ganja  via Hindi गांजा (gaanja or "hemp"), ultimately from Sanskrit गञ्जा (gañjā or "hemp").
 Gharry  via Hindi word gādī (Hindi: गाड़ी) which is ultimately derived from Sanskrit word garta (Sanskrit: गर्त) which means 'chariot'.
 Ginger  from Old English gingifer, gingiber, from Late Latin gingiber, from Latin zingiberi, from Greek zingiberis, from Prakrit (Middle Indic) singabera, from Sanskrit श्रङ्गवेर śrngavera, from śrnga "horn" + vera- "body", although, it may have derived instead from Tamil word "Inchi" (இஞ்சி).
 Gondwana  from two Sanskrit words, goṇḍa (Devanagari: गोण्ड) which means 'Gondi people or mountaineers' and vana (Devanagari: वन) which means 'forest'. 
 Guar  through Hindi गार ultimately from Sanskrit गोपाली gopālī, an annual legume.
 Gunny  via Persian گونی "Gooni" a burlap sack and Hindi गोनी, ultimately from Sanskrit गोणी goni "sack".
 Gurkha  via Nepalese गोर्खा ultimately from Sanskrit गोरक्ष goraksa, "a cowherd".
 Guru  via Hindi गुरु ultimately from Sanskrit गुरु guru, which means "a teacher".

J
 Jackal  from Turkish çakal, from Persian شغال shaghal, from Middle Indic shagal, ultimately from Sanskrit शृगाल srgala "the howler".
 Jaggery via Portuguese jágara, jagre and Malayalam ഛക്കര chakkara, ultimately from Sanskrit शर्करा śarkarā.
 Java  originally a kind of coffee grown on Java and nearby islands of modern Indonesia. By early 20c. it meant coffee generally. The island name is shortened from Sanskrit Yavadvipa "Island of Barley", from yava "barley" + dvipa "island".
 Juggernaut  through Odia ଜଗନ୍ନାଥ Jagannatha ultimately from Sanskrit जगन्नाथ jagat-natha-s, which means "lord of the world".
 Jungle  through Hindi जंगल jangal "a desert, forest"; also Persian جنگل jangal meaning forest; ultimately from Sanskrit जङ्गल jangala, which means "arid".
 Jute  from Sanskrit जुत juta-s, which means "twisted hair".

K
 Karma  from Sanskrit कर्मन् karman, which means "action".
 Kedgeree  probably ultimately from Sanskrit कृशर krśara.
 Kermes  via French: Kermès, and Persian قرمز qermez; perhaps ultimately from Sanskrit: कृमिज kṛmija meaning "worm-made".

L
 Lac  through Urdu لاکھ, Persian لاک and Hindi लाख lakh from Prakrit लक्ख lakkha, ultimately from Sanskrit लाक्षा lākṣā, meaning lac.
 Lacquer  through French: Laque and Portuguese: Laca from Arabic لك lakk,लाख in Hindi, via Prakrit ultimately from Sanskrit लाक्षा lākṣā.
 Langur  through Hindi लुट lut probably ultimately from Sanskrit लङ्गूल langūla.
 Lilac  via Arabic للك lilak from Persian نیلک nilak meaning "bluish", ultimately from Sanskrit नील nila, which means "dark blue".
 Loot  ultimately from Sanskrit लुण्टा lota-m or लुण्ठति luṇṭhati meaning "he steals" through Hindi लूट lūṭ, which means "a booty, stolen thing".

M
 Maharajah  through Hindi महाराजा ultimately from Sanskrit महाराजा mahā-rājā, which means "a great king".
 Maharani  through Hindi महारानी finally from Sanskrit महाराज्ञी mahārājnī, which means "consort of a maharajah".
 Maharishi  from Sanskrit महर्षि maha-rishi, which means "a great sage".
 Mahatma  from Sanskrit महात्मा mahatma, which means "a great breath, soul".
 Mahayana  from Sanskrit महायान maha-yana, which means "a great vehicle".
 Mahout  via Hindi माहुत (variant of महावत) ultimately from Sanskrit महामात्रः mahāmātrah.
 Mandala  from Sanskrit मण्डल mandala, which means "a disc, circle".
 Mandarin  via Portuguese mandarim, Dutch mandarijn, Malay mantri or menteri, and Hindi मंत्री mantri "a councillor" ultimately from Sanskrit मन्त्रिन् mantri, which means "an advisor".
 Mantra  from Sanskrit मन्त्र mantra-s which means "a holy message or text".
 Maya  from Sanskrit माया māyā, a religious term related with illusion.
 Moksha  from Sanskrit मोक्ष moksha, liberation from the cycle of death and rebirth.
 Mugger  via Hindi मगर and Urdu مگر magar ultimately from Sanskrit मकर makara ("sea creature"), like a crocodile, which attacks stealthily.
 Mung bean  through Hindi मुग mū̃g and Pali/Prakrit मुग्ग mugga ultimately from Sanskrit मुद्ग mudga, a kind of bean.
 Musk  via Middle English muske, Middle French Musc, Late Latin Muscus and Late Greek μόσχος moskhos from Persian موشک mushk, ultimately from Sanskrit मुस्क muska meaning "a testicle", from a diminutive of मुस mus ("mouse").
 Mynah  through Hindi मैना maina ultimately from Sanskrit मदन madana-s, which means "love".

N
 Nainsook through Hindi नैनसुख nainsukh ultimately from Sanskrit नयनसुख nayana-sukha, meaning "pleasing to the eyes".
 Nard  through Old French narde and Latin nardus from Greek νάρδος nardos, perhaps ultimately from Sanskrit नलद nalada.
 Narghile  through French Narguilé and Persian نارگيله nārghīleh ultimately from Sanskrit नारिकेल nārikela.
 Nark  probably from Romany nak "a nose", via Hindi नक nak ultimately from Sanskrit नक्र‌ nakra.
 Neem  through Hindi नीम nīm ultimately from Sanskrit निम्ब nimba, a kind of tree.
 Nilgai  through Hindi नीलगाय nīlgāy lit., blue cow ultimately from Sanskrit नीलगौ nīla-gau, an ox-like animal.
 Nirvana  from Sanskrit निर्वाण nirvāṇa which means "extinction, disappearance".

O
 Opal  through French opalle from Latin opalus from Greek ὀπάλλιος opallios, probably ultimately from Sanskrit उपल upala.
 Orange  through Old French orenge, Medieval Latin orenge and Italian arancia from Arabic نارنج naranj, via Persian نارنگ narang and Sanskrit नारङ्ग naranga-s meaning "an orange tree", derived from proto-Dravidian.

P
 Pal  1788, from Romany (English Gypsy) pal "brother, comrade", variant of continental Romany pral, plal, phral, probably from Sanskrit bhrata "brother" 
 Palanquin  via Odia word pālankī (Odia:ପାଲଙ୍କି) which is ultimately derived from Sanskrit पल्यङ्क palyanka which means 'bed' or 'couch'.
 Parcheesi  1800, from Hindi pachisi, from pachis "twenty-five" (highest throw of the dice), from Sanskrit panca "five" 
 Pepper  Old English pipor, from an early West Germanic borrowing of Latin piper "pepper", from Greek piperi, probably (via Persian) from Middle Indic pippari, from Sanskrit pippali "long pepper".
 Punch  via Sanskrit पञ्च pancha, meaning "five". The original drink was made from five ingredients: alcohol, sugar, lemon, water, and tea or spices. (The other senses of 'punch' are unrelated.)
 Pundit  via Sanskrit पण्डित paṇdita, meaning "learned". A person who offers to mass media their opinion or commentary on a particular subject area.

R
 Raita  ultimately from Sanskrit राजिका rājikā via Hindi रायता rāytā, a south Asian condiment and side dish made of yogurt and vegetables.
 Raj  through Hindi राज and Pali/Prakrit रज्ज rajja ultimately from Sanskrit राज्य rājya, which means "a king" or "kingdom". Raj means kingdom or domain of a ruler.
 Rajah  through Hindi राज from Sanskrit राजन् rājān, which means "a king".
 Ramtil  through Hindi ultimately from Sanskrit रामतिल rāmatila, which means "a dark sesame".
 Rani  through Hindi रानी ultimately from Sanskrit राज्ञी rājnī, consort of a rajah.
 Rice  via Old French ris and Italian riso from Latin oriza, which is from Greek ὄρυζα oryza, through an Indo-Iranian tongue finally from Sanskrit व्रीहि vrihi "rice", ultimately derived from proto-Dravidian arisi.
 Rupee  through Hindi रुपया rupiyā ultimately from Sanskrit रूप्यक rūpyaka, an Indian silver coin.

S
 Saccharide  via Latin Saccharon and Greek σάκχαρον from Pali सक्खर sakkharā, ultimately from Sanskrit शर्करा sarkarā.
 Sambal  through Afrikaans, Indonesian and Tamil சம்பல் campāl ultimately from Sanskrit सम्बार sambhārei.
 Sambar  through Hindi ultimately from Sanskrit शंबरः śambarah, a kind of Asian deer.
 Sandalwood  via Middle English sandell, Old French sandale, Medieval Latin sandalum, Medieval Greek σανδάλιον sandalion (diminutive of σάνδαλον sandalon) and Arabic and Persian صندل; ultimately from Sanskrit चन्दन candana meaning "wood for burning incense".
 Sapphire  via Old French saphir, Latin sapphirus and Greek σάπφειρος sappheiros from a Semitic tongue (c.f. Hebrew: ספיר sapir); possibly the ultimate origin is Sanskrit शनिप्रिय sanipriya which literally means "sacred to Saturn (Shani)".
 Sari  through Hindi साड़ी sari and Prakrit सदि sadi, finally from Sanskrit सति sati "garment".
 Shampoo  via Anglo-Indian shampoo and Hindi चाँपो champo from Sanskrit चपयति capayati, which means "kneads".
 Shawl  from Persian شال shal, finally from Sanskrit शाटी śāṭī, which means "a strip of cloth".
 Singapore  via Malay Singapura ultimately from Sanskrit सिंहपुर simhapura, literally "the lion city".
 Sri Lanka  from Sanskrit: श्री लंका which means "venerable island". It is said that Shree or Lakshmi, the Goddess of wealth, resides there.
 Sugar  through Old French sucre, Italian zucchero, Medieval Latin succarum, Arabic: سكر sukkar and Persian: شکر shakar ultimately from Sanskrit शर्करा śarkara which means "ground or candied sugar" (originally "grit" or "gravel").
 Sunn  via Hindi: सुन्न ultimately from Sanskrit: सन sāna, a kind of Asian plant.
 Swami  through Hindi स्वामी swami ultimately from Sanskrit स्वामी svami, which means "a master".
 Swastika  from Sanskrit स्वस्तिक svastika, which means "one associated with well-being, a lucky charm".

T
 Taka  via Maithili and Bengali : টাকা from Sanskrit टङ्क tanka.
 Talipot  through Hindi, Indonesian and Malay talipat from Sanskrit तालपत्र tālapatra, a kind of palm.
 Tank  a word originally brought by the Portuguese from India, from a Hindi source, such as Gujarati tankh "cistern, underground reservoir for water", Marathi tanken, or tanka "reservoir of water, tank". Perhaps ultimately from Sanskrit tadaga "pond, lake pool", and reinforced in later sense of "large artificial container for liquid".
 Tendu  via Hindi ultimately from Sanskrit तैन्दुक tainduka.
 Teapoy  via Hindi तिपाई tipāi and Urdu تپائي tipāʼī,which originated as a Sanskrit compound: त्रि (trí, "three") and पाद (pā́da, "foot").
 Thug  through Marathi ठग thag probably ultimately from Sanskrit स्थग sthaga, which means "a scoundrel".
 Til  from Sanskrit तिलः tilah, a kind of plant.
 Toddy  through Hindi तरी tari ultimately from Sanskrit तल tala-s, a Dravidian origin is also probable.
 Toon  through Hindi तुन tūn ultimately from Sanskrit तुन्न tunna, a kind of tree.
 Tope  through Hindi टॉप ṭop probably from Prakrit थुपो thūpo, finally from Sanskrit स्तूप stūpa.
 Tutty  through Middle English tutie, Old French, Medieval Latin tūtia, Arabic توتي tūtiyā, and Persian توتیا ultimately from Sanskrit तुत्थ tuttha meaning "blue vitriol", a Dravidian origin is also probable.

V
 Vina  ultimately from Sanskrit वीणा vīṇā through Hindi वीणा vīṇā, a kind of musical instrument.

W
 Wanderoo  through   finally from Sanskrit वानर vānara, a kind of monkey.

Y
 Yoga  through Sanskrit योग yoga-s, which means "yoke, union".
 Yogi  through Hindi योगी yogi from Sanskrit योगी yogi, one who practices yoga or ascetic.

Z
 Zen  through Japanese 禅 and Chinese 禪 Chán ultimately from Pali झान jhāna and Sanskrit ध्यान dhyana, which means "a meditation".

See also
 Indian English
 List of Hindu deities
 Lists of English words by country or language of origin

References

External links
Sanskrit in Freedictionary.com
Sanskrit Dictionary containing terms of modern Spoken Sanskrit

Sanskrit
Sanskrit

da:Danske ords etymologi